This is a list of public art in Los Angeles.  This list applies only to works of public art accessible in an outdoor public space. For example, this does not include artwork visible inside a museum.

Most of the works mentioned are sculptures. When this is not the case (i.e. sound installation, for example) it is stated next to the title.

Downtown Los Angeles

Central Los Angeles

East Los Angeles & Northeast Los Angeles

Harbor

South Los Angeles

The Valley

West Los Angeles

See also
 Murals of Kobe Bryant

References

Art in Greater Los Angeles
Public art
Los Angeles
Los Angeles
Public art